Elijah Tamboo (born 22 October 1993) is a Seychellois professional footballer who plays as a forward for Seychelles First Division side Saint Louis Suns United.

Career statistics

Club

Notes

International

International goals
Scores and results list the Seychelles' goal tally first.

References

External links
 

1993 births
Living people
Seychellois footballers
Seychelles international footballers
Association football forwards
Saint Louis Suns United FC players